The 2022 Dutch TT (officially known as the Motul TT Assen) was the eleventh round of the 2022 Grand Prix motorcycle racing season and the fourth round of the 2022 MotoE World Cup. All races (except MotoE race 1 which was held on 25 June) were held at the TT Circuit Assen in Assen on 26 June 2022.

Qualifying

MotoGP

Race

MotoGP
{| class="wikitable sortable" style="font-size: 85%;"
! scope="col" |
! scope="col" |
! scope="col" |Biker
! scope="col" |Constructor
! scope="col" class="unsortable"|
! scope="col" class="unsortable"|Time/Retired
! scope="col" |
! scope="col" |Points
|-
! scope="row" |1
| align="center" |63
| Francesco Bagnaia
|Ducati
|26
| 40:25.205
| align="center" |1
| align="center" |25 
|-
! scope="row" |2
| align="center" |72
| Marco Bezzecchi
|Ducati
|26
| +0.444
| align="center" |4
| align="center" |20
|- 
! scope="row" |3
| align="center" |12
| Maverick Viñales
|Aprilia
|26
| +1.209
| align="center" |11
| align="center" |16
|-
! scope="row" |4
| align="center" |41
| Aleix Espargaró
|Aprilia
|26
| +2.585
| align="center" |5
| align="center" |13 
|-
! scope="row" |5
| align="center" |33
| Brad Binder
|KTM
|26
| +2.721
| align="center" |10
| align="center" |11
|-
! scope="row" |6
| align="center" |43
| Jack Miller
|Ducati
|26
| +3.045
| align="center" |6
| align="center" |10 
|-
! scope="row" |7
| align="center" |89
| Jorge Martín
|Ducati
|26
| +4.340
| align="center" |3
| align="center" |9
|-
! scope="row" |8
| align="center" |36
| Joan Mir
|Suzuki
|26
| +8.185
| align="center" |14
| align="center" |8
|-
! scope="row" |9
| align="center" |88
| Miguel Oliveira
|KTM
|26
| +8.325
| align="center" |8
| align="center" |7
|-
! scope="row" |10
| align="center" |42
| Álex Rins
|Suzuki
|26
| +8.596
| align="center" |9
| align="center" |6 
|-
! scope="row" |11
| align="center" |23
| Enea Bastianini
|Ducati
|26
| +9.783
| align="center" |16
| align="center" | 5
|-
! scope="row" |12
| align="center" |30
| Takaaki Nakagami
|Honda
|26
| +10.617
| align="center" |12
| align="center" |4
|-
! scope="row" |13
| align="center" |5
| Johann Zarco
|Ducati
|26
| +14.405
| align="center" |7
| align="center" |3
|-
! scope="row" |14
| align="center" |49
| Fabio Di Giannantonio
|Ducati
|26
| +17.681
| align="center" |15
| align="center" |2 
|-
! scope="row" |15
| align="center" |73
| Álex Márquez
|Honda
|26
| +25.866
| align="center" |21
| align="center" |1
|-
! scope="row" |16
| align="center" |04
| Andrea Dovizioso
|Yamaha
|26
| +29.711
| align="center" |17
| 
|-
! scope="row" |17
| align="center" |10
| Luca Marini 
|Ducati|26
| +30.296
| align="center" |13
|  
|-
! scope="row" |18
| align="center" |6
| Stefan Bradl
|Honda
|26
| +32.225
| align="center" |18
|  
|-
! scope="row" |19
| align="center" | 87
| Remy Gardner
|KTM
|26
| +34.947
| align="center" |19
| align="center" | 
|-
! scope="row" |20
| align="center" | 32
| Lorenzo Savadori
|Aprilia
|26
| +35.798
| align="center" |22
| align="center" | 
|-
! scope="row" |Ret
| align="center" |25
| Raúl Fernández
|KTM
|18
| Arm Pump
| align="center" |23
| 
|-
! scope="row" |Ret
| align="center" |20
| Fabio Quartararo
|Yamaha
|11
| Accident
| align="center" |2
| 
|-
! scope="row" |Ret
| align="center" |40
| Darryn Binder
|Yamaha
|8
| Accident
| align="center" |24
| align="center" | 
|-
! scope="row" |Ret
| align="center" |21
| Franco Morbidelli
|Yamaha
|8
| Accident Damage
| align="center" |20
| 
|-
! scope="row" |DNS
| align="center" |44
| Pol Espargaró
|Honda
| 
| Did not start
| align="center" |
| 
|-class="sortbottom"
|colspan="9" style="text-align:center"|Fastest lap:  Aleix Espargaró (Aprilia) – 1:32.500 (lap 15)
|-
!colspan=9| OFFICIAL MOTOGP RACE REPORT
|}
 Pol Espargaró withdrew from the event after FP2 due to a rib injury suffered at the German Grand Prix.

Moto2

 Arón Canet withdrew from the event due to effects of a broken nose suffered in a road accident.

Moto3

 MotoE 

 Race 1 Notes:'''
 - Unai Orradre was demoted one position due to exceeding track limits on the final lap.
All bikes manufactured by Energica.

Race 2 

 Notes
  – The race was red-flagged during lap 4 after Miquel Pons' crash. The race was not restarted and results were declared effective after the end of lap 3. Half points were awarded, as less than two thirds of the race distance (but at least three full laps) was completed.
All bikes manufactured by Energica.

Championship standings after the race
Below are the standings for the top five riders, constructors, and teams after the round.

MotoGP

Riders' Championship standings

Constructors' Championship standings

Teams' Championship standings

Moto2

Riders' Championship standings

Constructors' Championship standings

Teams' Championship standings

Moto3

Riders' Championship standings

Constructors' Championship standings

Teams' Championship standings

MotoE

References

External links

2022 MotoGP race reports
2022
TT
TT